Korff is a last name shared by the following people:
Arnold Korff (1870–1944), Hollywood actor and director
André Korff (born 1973), German bicycle racer
Baruch Korff, (1914–1995), Jewish community activist
Hans-Peter Korff (born 1942), German actor
Johann Albrecht von Korff (1697–1766), diplomat, president of the St. Petersburg Academy of Sciences 
Michael Von Korff (born 1949), American epidemiologist
Werner Korff (1911–unknown), German Olympic ice hockey player
Yitzhak Aharon Korff, grand rabbi, diplomat and consultant in international law and business, entrepreneur,

See also
Korf (disambiguation)